Blue cheese is a general classification of cheeses that have had cultures of the mold Penicillium added so that the final product is spotted or veined throughout with blue, or blue-grey mold and carries a distinct smell, either from that or various specially cultivated bacteria. Some blue cheeses are injected with spores before the curds form, and others have spores mixed in with the curds after they form. Blue cheeses are typically aged in a temperature-controlled environment such as a cave. Blue cheese can be eaten by itself or can be spread, crumbled or melted into or over foods.

Blue cheeses

 Ädelost
 Aura cheese
 Beenleigh Blue
 Bleu Bénédictin
 Bleu d'Auvergne
 Bleu de Bresse
 Bleu de Gex
 Bleu des Causses
 Bleu du Vercors-Sassenage
 Bleuchâtel
 Blue Cheshire
 Brighton Blue
 Buxton Blue
 Cabrales cheese
 Cambozola
 Carré d'Aurillac
 Cashel Blue
 Castello
 Cherni Vit
 Danish Blue Cheese
 Dolcelatte
 Dorset Blue Vinney
 Dovedale cheese
 Dragon's Breath Blue
 Fourme d'Ambert
 Fourme de Montbrison
 Gamalost
 Gorgonzola
 Kariki Tinou
 Lanark Blue
 Lymeswold cheese
 Maytag Blue cheese
 
 Norbury Blue
 Oxford Blue
 Picón Bejes-Tresviso
 Rokpol
 Roquefort
 Saga
 Saint Agur Blue
 Shropshire Blue
 Stichelton
 Stilton cheese
 Valdeón cheese
 Wensleydale cheese
 Yorkshire Blue

See also
 List of cheeses
 Blue cheese

References

External links
 

 Blue cheeses
Blue